Acidus, a Latin adjective meaning sour, tart or acid, may refer to:

See also 
 Acida (disambiguation)
 Acidum (disambiguation)